Talla Water is a river in the Scottish Borders area of Scotland, near Tweedsmuir. It feeds the Talla Reservoir, and is a tributary of the River Tweed. Above the reservoir are a series of waterfalls known as the Talla Linns.

The Talla Railway was constructed to facilitate the building work, especially the Tweed Viaduct.

See also
List of places in the Scottish Borders
List of places in Scotland

References

External links
RCAHMS/Canmore entry for Talla Reservoir
RAILSCOT article on the Talla Railway

Rivers of the Scottish Borders
Tributaries of the River Tweed
1Talla